Essaïd Abelouache (born 20 July 1988) is a Moroccan racing cyclist, who rides for Emirati amateur team Al Shafar Jumeirah Cycling Team. He rode at the 2014 UCI Road World Championships.

Major results

2011
 National Road Championships
2nd Road race
6th Time trial
2012
 Les Challenges de la Marche Verte
2nd GP Al Massira
8th GP Oued Eddahab
9th GP Sakia El Hamra
 Challenge du Prince
3rd Trophée Princier
7th Trophée de la Maison Royale
 8th Road race, National Road Championships
2013
 Les Challenges de la Marche Verte
1st GP Sakia El Hamra
3rd GP Oued Eddahab
5th GP Al Massira
 Tour du Maroc
1st  Points classification
1st Stages 1 & 5
 3rd Overall 2012–13 UCI Africa Tour
 5th Overall Tour d'Algérie
1st  Points classification
 Challenge du Prince
5th Trophée Princier
7th Trophée de la Maison Royale
7th Trophée de l'Anniversaire
 6th Time trial, National Road Championships
2014
 Les Challenges de la Marche Verte
1st GP Sakia El Hamra
4th GP Oued Eddahab
 1st Stage 3 Tour d'Algérie
 2nd Overall Grand Prix Chantal Biya
 3rd Critérium International d'Alger
 Challenge du Prince
3rd Trophée de l'Anniversaire
4th Trophée de la Maison Royale
 4th Road race, National Road Championships
 5th Critérium International de Blida
 6th Grand Prix d'Oran
 8th Overall Tour du Maroc
2015
 Challenge du Prince
1st Trophée de l'Anniversaire
2nd Trophée Princier
5th Trophée de la Maison Royale
 Les Challenges de la Marche Verte
1st GP Oued Eddahab
2nd GP Sakia El Hamra
5th GP Al Massira
 La Tropicale Amissa Bongo
1st  Sprints classification
1st Stage 6 (TTT)
 2nd Road race, National Road Championships
 3rd Overall UCI Africa Tour
 3rd UAE Cup
 Challenge des phosphates
3rd Grand Prix Fkih Ben Saleh
4th Grand Prix de Khouribga
10th Grand Prix de Ben Guerir
 5th Circuit d'Alger
 8th Overall Tour d'Egypte
2016
 1st  Overall Tour International de Sétif
1st  Mountains classification
1st Stage 2
 2nd Overall Tour d'Oranie
 2nd Circuit de Constantine
 3rd Overall Tour de Blida
 3rd Overall Tour de Constantine
1st  Mountains classification
 4th Overall Tour d'Annaba
1st  Mountains classification
1st Stage 4
 5th Overall Tour of Mersin
1st  Points classification
1st Stage 4
 7th Grand Prix d'Oran
 10th Circuit d'Alger
 10th Critérium International de Blida
2017
 1st  Road race, National Road Championships
 2nd Trophée Princier, Challenge du Prince
 9th GP Sakia El Hamra, Les Challenges de la Marche Verte
2018
 10th Overall Grand Prix International de la ville d'Alger

References

External links
 

1988 births
Living people
Moroccan male cyclists